Stepan Papelyan (1875 - 12 November, 1960) was an Armenian pedagogue, composer and writer.

Biography 
Papelyan was born in Scutari (now Üsküdar) district of Constantinople [now Istanbul] in the Ottoman Empire. He attended the Berberian School and displayed an early interest in music. There he studied the piano with Avedis Horasandjian and later with composer Haroutioun Sinanian.

However, his real calling was teaching. Papelyan developed the principles of his teaching method by examining various treatises on educational philosophy, by learning from experience and by reflecting on the act of performance itself. He was the first teacher to organize student recitals in Istanbul, which proved to be a huge success both for the students and their parents. Following the concerts Papelyan would also write a critique of each student’s progress and accordingly move him or her to an appropriate class.

After the Great Fire of Üsküdar in 1921, when the Papelyan household was destroyed, Stepan first moved to the neighboring district of Kadıköy, and then to Pera (now Beyoğlu), where he continued his musical activities.

He wrote numerous articles in the Armenian media about literature, art, philosophy and events of the time. He was particularly gifted in explaining difficult subjects in simple and understandable terms. His analysis of Beethoven’s Ninth Symphony is of particular interest.

Stepan Papelyan died in Istanbul in 1960 and is buried in the Şişli Armenian Cemetery.

Compositions

Piano
Vers le passé
La fin d’un rêve
Clair de lune
Nostalgie
Polka
Mazurka

References

1875 births
1960 deaths
Armenian composers
Armenian educators
Berberian School alumni
Burials at Şişli Armenian Cemetery
Armenians from the Ottoman Empire
Writers from the Ottoman Empire
Composers from the Ottoman Empire
Educators from the Ottoman Empire